John Patrick Mulligan (18 June 1919 – 5 July 2000) was an Australian rules footballer who played with South Melbourne in the Victorian Football League (VFL).

Mulligan also served in both the Australian Army and Royal Australian Air Force in World War II.

Notes

External links 

1919 births
2000 deaths
Australian rules footballers from Victoria (Australia)
Sydney Swans players